Nuts Bang is Flow's first major extended play. It reached #23 on the Oricon charts  and charted for 3 weeks.

Track listing

References

2009 EPs
Flow (band) albums